Prazhskaya is a station on the Serpukhovsko-Timiryazevskaya Line of the Moscow Metro. As part of a cultural exchange between the Soviet Union and Czechoslovakia, the station was designed in the style of the Prague Metro by Czech architects E. Kyllar, Z. Chalupa, and E. Břusková along with Soviet architect V. A. Cheremin. A corresponding station named Moskevská (currently named Anděl) in Prague was designed by Soviet architects and opened concurrently.

Gallery

References

Moscow Metro stations
Serpukhovsko-Timiryazevskaya Line
Railway stations located underground in Russia